James "Jim" Wild (birth unknown – death unknown) was a professional rugby league footballer who played in the 1910s and 1920s.

Notable tour matches
Jim Wild played  in Wakefield Trinity's 3–29 defeat by Australia in the 1921–22 Kangaroo tour of Great Britain match at Belle Vue, Wakefield on Saturday 22 October 1921.

References

External links
Search for "Wild" at rugbyleagueproject.org

Rugby league locks
Wakefield Trinity players
Place of birth missing
Place of death missing
Year of birth missing
Year of death missing